Naval Air Station Joint Reserve Base New Orleans is a base of the United States military located in Belle Chasse, unincorporated Plaquemines Parish, Louisiana, United States. NAS JRB New Orleans is home to a Navy Reserve strike fighter squadron and a fleet logistics support squadron, the 159th Fighter Wing (159 FW) of the Louisiana Air National Guard, Coast Guard Air Station New Orleans, a detachment of a Marine Corps Reserve light helicopter attack squadron, as well as other US Navy and US Army activities. The base has a 24/7 operating schedule to support both the 159 FW's NORAD air sovereignty/homeland defense requirements and for Coast Guard Air Station New Orleans search and rescue/maritime law enforcement/port security missions. It contains a military airport known as Alvin Callender Field  which is located three nautical miles (6 km) south of the central business district of New Orleans. The base's predecessor, NAS New Orleans, occupied the current location of the University of New Orleans's principal campus until 1957.

Occupants

Current occupants 
 Fighter Squadron Composite 204 (VFC-204), U.S. Navy Reserve, operating F-5N/F Tiger II fighter-attack aircraft
VMR Belle Chase
159th Fighter Wing (159 FW), Louisiana Air National Guard, operating F-15C/D Eagle fighter aircraft
Fleet Logistics Support Squadron 54 (VR-54), U.S. Navy Reserve, operating C-130T Hercules transport aircraft
Detachment A, Marine Light Attack Helicopter Squadron 773 (HMLA-773), U.S. Marine Corps Reserve, operating UH-1Y "Super Huey" utility helicopters & AH-1 Super Cobra attack helicopters
Coast Guard Air Station New Orleans, operating MH-65C Dolphin helicopters
NCTAMS LANT Det New Orleans
3rd Battalion, 23rd Marines
Navy Operational Support Center New Orleans
377th Theater Sustainment Command
FRC Mid-Atlantic Site New Orleans
Region Legal Service Office Southeast Det New Orleans
Navy Air Logistics Office
Military Entrance Processing Station (a.k.a. MEPS), New Orleans

Previous occupants 

VAW-77 "Nightwolves", U.S. Navy Reserve, which was the Navy's only aerial counter-narcotics unit, and flew the E-2 Hawkeye
VP-94 "Crawfishers", U.S. Navy Reserve, an anti-submarine warfare/maritime patrol unit that flew the P-3 Orion
VC-13, U.S. Navy Reserve, a fleet adversary unit flying the A-4 Skyhawk; relocated to NAS Miramar, CA (redesignated VFC-13 and relocated to NAS Fallon, NV) flying the F-5 Tiger II)
Marine Aircraft Group 46 Detachment B
Marine Aircraft Group 42
926th Fighter Wing (Air Force Reserve Command), which flew the A-10 Thunderbolt II; relocated to Nellis AFB, NV and re-designated as the 926th Wing, an Associate unit to the USAF Warfare Center 
U.S. Customs Service air operations
Civil Air Patrol, SWR-LA-086

Facilities 
NAS JRB New Orleans (Alvin Callender Field) has two runways with PEM surfaces: 4/22 is 9,999 by 200 feet (3,048 × 61 m) and 14/32 is 6,000 by 200 feet (1,829 × 61 m).

Demographics
It was named a census-designated place (New Orleans Station CDP) in the 2020 census.

See also 

 List of United States Navy airfields

References

External links 

 
 
 

 
New Orleans, Naval Air Station Joint Reserve Base
Airports in Louisiana
Buildings and structures in Plaquemines Parish, Louisiana
Installations of the United States Air National Guard
Military installations in Louisiana
Transportation in Plaquemines Parish, Louisiana
Transportation in the New Orleans metropolitan area
Airports in the New Orleans metropolitan area
1958 establishments in Louisiana
Military installations established in 1958